Barbara Anne Kendall  (born 30 August 1967) is a former boardsailor from New Zealand.  She competed at five Summer Olympic Games and won gold, silver and bronze medals.

Biography
Kendall was born in Papakura on 30 August 1967, the daughter of Tony and Peggy Kendall. She was raised in the Auckland suburb of Bucklands Beach and attended Macleans College. She won a gold medal at the 1992 Summer Olympics in Barcelona, silver medal in 1996 (in Atlanta, Georgia), and a bronze medal in 2000 (in Sydney). Kendall finished 5th at the 2004 Games in Athens and sixth at the 2008 Games in Beijing. She was the first, and as of 2008. (She has since been joined by Valerie Adams, Tokyo 2021. Luuka Jones has stated her intention to compete in her fifth Olympics in Paris 2024 to join them.)

During 1998, she had founded Gulf Harbour School on the coast of Auckland. In 2008, she returned and created a mural for the school.

Kendall was the Oceania athletes' representative on the International Olympic Committee from 2005 to 2008, having replaced Susie O'Neill who resigned in 2005 (Kendall was the athlete from the same continent who had received the next highest number of votes for the commission), and was on the New Zealand Olympic Committee Athletes Commission until 2008. In July 2011, she was elected as a member of the International Olympic Committee and the IOC Athletes' Commission and sat on the Women and Sport Commission and Sport and the Environment Commission until August 2016.

Kendall's brother Bruce is also an Olympic Gold medallist. They are the first brother and sister to have achieved this feat for New Zealand.

Kendall officially retired from competitive board sailing in May 2010.

Honours and awards
In 1990, Kendall was awarded the New Zealand 1990 Commemoration Medal. In the 1993 New Year Honours, she was appointed a Member of the Order of the British Empire, for services to boardsailing. In the 2019 New Year Honours, she was made a Companion of the New Zealand Order of Merit, for services to sport.

See also
 Women multiple medallist at the Windsurfing World Championships

References

Citations

Bibliography

External links
 

|-

|-

1967 births
Living people
New Zealand windsurfers
Female windsurfers
New Zealand female sailors (sport)
Olympic gold medalists for New Zealand in sailing
Olympic silver medalists for New Zealand
Olympic bronze medalists for New Zealand
Sailors at the 1992 Summer Olympics – Lechner A-390
Sailors at the 1996 Summer Olympics – Mistral One Design
Sailors at the 2000 Summer Olympics – Mistral One Design
Sailors at the 2004 Summer Olympics – Mistral One Design
Sailors at the 2008 Summer Olympics – RS:X
Medalists at the 1992 Summer Olympics
Medalists at the 1996 Summer Olympics
Medalists at the 2000 Summer Olympics
International Olympic Committee members
New Zealand sports executives and administrators
New Zealand Members of the Order of the British Empire
People from Papakura
People educated at Macleans College
Companions of the New Zealand Order of Merit